Jean-Jacques (Jack) Sels (29 January 1922 – 21 March 1970) was a Belgian jazz saxophonist, arranger, and composer.

Biography
Jack Sels grew up in Antwerp, as a teenager he started collecting jazz records. Due to a substantial inheritance from his father his collection grew to about 10,000 records, but it was destroyed during a Second World War bombing.  First having studied piano he taught himself playing the tenor saxophone. To earn a living, he worked in an ice cream parlour in the Antwerp Hoogstraat (High Street) and spent much time listening to his jazz idols, among them the tenor saxophonist Lester Young, trumpeters Miles Davis and Dizzy Gillespie and alto saxophonist Charlie Parker. After the Second World War many American and Canadian soldiers arrived in the port of Antwerp and Jack Sels loved to talk to them and listen to the new records they brought with them from the United States, helping him to further expand his record collection.

The arrival of Dizzy Gillespie's big band at Antwerp in 1948 made a lasting impression on Jack Sels and he decided to start his own big band for which he would also write the music. The band made an impressive debut with some of the best musicians of that time. On trumpet: Paul Heyndrickx, Charlie Knegtel, Theo Mertens, Herman and Nick Sandy Fissette; on trombone: Nat Peck, Frans Van Dijk, Jan Mertens and Christian Kellens; on Sax: Jay Cameron, Marcel Peeters, Gene Verstrepen, Bobby Jaspar and Roger Asselberghs plus Jean Warland on bass, Francis Coppieters on piano, John Ward on drums, Rudy Frankel on conga and Vilez Bill on bongo drum. But because of financial and other problems it was hard for him to hold such a big band together. In 1951, he formed a smaller band with 15 musicians, modelled after his idol Miles Davis, and later a still smaller group with which he toured in Germany. Back in Belgium, in 1954, he recorded six tracks in boogy style for Ronnex Records and performed on stage with Nat King Cole.

In 1955 he composed the soundtrack for the movie Meeuwen Sterven in de Haven (Seagulls Die in the Harbour) by Roland Verhavert. From 1958 on, he worked on radio programs for the NIR, the later BRT radio, and on behalf of the Adult Education department of the Ministry of Culture, he toured through Flanders to promote jazz music. In 1958 he played with his group at the World Exhibition in Brussels.

Although Jack Sels played with jazz legends like Dizzy Gillespie, Lester Young, Lou Bennett and Kenny Clarke, his fame did not spread worldwide because of his choice to stay in Antwerp. The last three years of his life his health declined, making it very difficult for him to play. He suffered a heart attack in his Antwerp home and died on 21 March 1970.

References

 Jazzinbelgium: Jack sels

External links
 Jack Sels discography

1922 births
1970 deaths
Belgian jazz musicians
Belgian jazz saxophonists
Bebop saxophonists
Jazz saxophonists
20th-century saxophonists